Sankt Martin may refer to the following places:

Sankt Martin, Germany, in Rhineland-Palatinate, Germany
in Austria:
Sankt Martin, Lower Austria, in Lower Austria
Sankt Martin im Innkreis, in Upper Austria
Sankt Martin im Mühlkreis, in Upper Austria
Sankt Martin an der Raab, in Burgenland
Markt Sankt Martin, in Burgenland
Sankt Martin am Tennengebirge, in Salzburg
Sankt Martin bei Lofer, in Salzburg
Sankt Martin am Grimming, in Styria
Sankt Martin am Wöllmißberg, in Styria
Sankt Martin im Sulmtal, in Styria
St. Martin, Graubünden, in Graubünden, Switzerland
in Italy:
St. Martin in Thurn, the German name for San Martin de Tor, South Tyrol
St. Martin in Passeier, South Tyrol
Sankt Martin, the German name for Târnăveni, Romania
Turz-Sankt Martin, the former name of Martin, Slovakia

See also 
 St. Martin